Rahn may refer to:

People
 Helmut Rahn (1929–2003), German footballer
 Johann Rahn (1622–1676), Swiss mathematician
 Matthias Rahn (born 1990), German footballer
 Muriel Rahn (1911–1961), American singer and actress
 Otto Rahn (1904–1939), German medievalist and an Obersturmführer of the SS
 Richard W. Rahn (born 1942), American economist
 Uwe Rahn (born 1962), German footballer
 Werner Rahn (born 1939), German historian and former naval officer

Places 
 Rahn, Iran
 Rahn, Oman
 Rahn Township, Pennsylvania, U.S.

See also 
 
 Taavi Rähn, an Estonian professional footballer
 Rahns, Pennsylvania, U.S.